The 1915 Columbus Panhandles season was their tenth season in existence. The team played in the Ohio League and posted an 8–3–1 record.

Schedule

Game notes

References
Pro Football Archives: 1915 Columbus Panhandles season

Columbus Panhandles seasons
Columbus Pan
Columbus Pan